Microcornea, glaucoma, and absent frontal sinuses is a very rare developmental genetic disorder that occurs during embryogenesis which is characterized by a combination of microcornea, glaucoma and missing/underdeveloped sinuses. Additional findings include increased palmar skin thickness and torus palatinus. It has been described in four members of a 3-generation family from Boston, Massachusetts (1969).

References 

Genetic diseases and disorders